Portland, with its capital town Port Antonio, is a parish located on Jamaica's northeast coast. It is one of the rural areas of Jamaica, containing part of the Blue Mountains, where the Jamaican Maroon communities of Moore Town and Charles Town are located.

Geography and demography

The parish lies in the direct path of the northeast trade winds, and the Blue Mountain ridge to its south traps the moisture. This parish has the highest rainfall in the island. Port Antonio, its chief town and capital, has two harbours, the western one being sheltered by a small islet, Navy Island. Portland covers an area of 814 square kilometers, making it Jamaica's seventh-largest parish.

The parish has a variety of complex landforms; the entire coastline is dotted with caves, bays, rivers, waterfalls and hills. There are fourteen caves, which include those at Buff Bay, Orange Bay, Hope Bay, Port Antonio, Boston Bay, Long Bay, Innis Bay and Nonsuch. There are also 17 rivers which form a network throughout the parish. The largest are the Rio Grande, Buff Bay and Hectors rivers.

The population of Portland is an estimated 82,183, 15,000 of whom live in the capital town. Its people are 89.8% black, 1.2% white, 5.3% Asians, 2.6% mixed race, and 1.1% other. It includes the separate Maroon communities of Charles Town, Jamaica and Moore Town.

Commerce

Agriculture

The parish is a leading producer of bananas, coconuts, breadfruits, coffee, mangoes and ackee which are grown for export as well as local consumption. Portland has very rich land on its coastal strips that is suitable for any kind of cultivation, so many domestic crops are grown. Manufacturing is a small sector of the economy, with about 18 factories. They also do farming.

Tourism

A number of tourist facilities exist in the area, including Trident Villas and Hotel, Jamaica Palace, Dragon Bay Villas, Goblin Hill Hotel, Jamaica Crest, Fern Hill Club, and Mocking Bird Hill.

Attractions
Because of its natural environment, tourism has often flourished in the parish. It is noted for its beaches, such as Frenchman's Cove, Boston Beach, Winifred, and Dragon Bay. The Blue Mountains are also located in Portland; two Maroon communities are located there. The internationally known Blue Lagoon is in this parish; it is believed to be the crater of an extinct volcano. The lagoon is an almost landlocked cove with approximately 55 m (180 ft) of water. Rafting on the Rio Grande is also a tourist attraction.

Boston Jerk Centre in Portland is an area well known for its "jerked" foods, including chicken, fish and pork. Jerked foods are foods made with Jamaican jerk spice and traditional technique.

Other activities
Since the early 1950s, more than 782 film or screen productions have been shot in Portland. Two of the most popular are Twenty Thousand Leagues Under the Sea, by Walt Disney (USA) in 1954 and The Harder They Come by Vista Productions (Jamaica) in 1972. Scenes from the film Cocktail, starring Tom Cruise, were shot at the bar on the beach at the Dragon Bay resort. An early film edition of the 1963 version of Lord of the Flies was largely shot at Frenchman's Cove; the 1990 remake by Harry Hook was filmed at Frenchman's Cove and Snow Hill. Barbadian singer Rihanna filmed the video for her song "Man Down" in various locations throughout the parish in April/May 2011. American singer Santigold filmed the video for her song "Disparate Youth" in the parish. The video was released in March 2012.

Politics 
Portland Parish is part of two parliamentary constituencies; Portland Eastern and Portland Western.

Places

Towns
 Buff Bay
 Cattawood Springs
 Hope Bay
 Manchioneal
 Port Antonio, Capital
 St. Margaret's Bay
 Norwich
 Snow Hill
 Boston
 Drapers
 Fruitful Vale
 Shrewsbury
 Coopers Hill
 Moore Town
 Charles Town, Jamaica
 Fellowship
 Mount Pleasant

Rivers
 Buff Bay River
 Daniels River
Hectors River
 Rio Grande
 Spanish River 
 Swift River
 Reach Falls
 Somerset Falls
 Danny River

Islands
 Navy Island, Jamaica
 Pelew (Monkey) Island
 Ship Rock Island (Lord of the Flies, 1992)
 Wood Island
 Christmas Island

Beaches
 Boston Beach
 Long Bay Beach
 Frenchman's Cove
 Winifred's Beach
 San San Beach
 San shy Beach
 Pt. Antonio Pier
 Titchfield beach

Notable residents
 Edward Baugh (b. 1936) - Jamaican writer and lecturer, resided in Portland and attended Titchfield High School.
 Errol Flynn (1909–1959) - American film and screen star, made Portland his home with an expansive estate to the east of the parish. His wife Patrice Wymore Flynn resided there until her death on 22 March 2014. 
 Duke Reid (1915–1975) - Jamaican disc jockey and record producer 
 Roy Reid (b. 1937) - Jamaican painter, grew up in Portland.
 Rustie Lee (b. 1949) - Jamaican television personality, television chef, actress, singer and former politician.

References

External links
Profile of Portland
Portland, Jamaica Official Instagram Page
Political Geography of Jamaica

 
Parishes of Jamaica